The M728 Combat Engineer Vehicle (CEV) is a full-tracked vehicle used for breaching, obstacle removal, and pioneering operations. Production commenced in 1965 and ceased in 1987. A total of 312 of all variants of these armored engineer vehicles were produced.

Design

Development and Production
Prototype development began in the late 1940s at Ft. Belvoir, VA by the US Army Engineer Research & Development Laboratories in conjunction with Chrysler. These early T39 Demolition Tank prototypes were based on the M26 using several different modified turrets, demolition guns and heavy mortars. The T118 prototypes used the T95 hull beginning in 1960. Both prototypes went through extensive testing at the Aberdeen Proving Grounds through 1963 and final trials in 1964. The T118E1, with a modified M60A1 turret was then accepted into service as the M728 in 1965 and achieved operational capability in 1968.  The turrets for the M728 were manufactured at Chrysler Corp.'s Detroit Arsenal Tank Plant, Warren, Michigan.  Final assembly and mating to the vehicle hulls was performed at Anniston Army Depot in Alabama.  Initial production of the M728 was from 1965 to 1972.  Many of the M782A1s were former M60A2 Patton tanks converted to M728A1s from 1982 to 1987. All M728A1s were converted and assembled at the Anniston Army Depot under contract with General Dynamics Land Systems with a  total of 312 of all variants produced.

Vehicle Description
The M728  is a full-tracked combat engineer vehicle designed to provide maximum ballistic protection for the crew. It is a heavily armed derivative of the M60 series tank modified to provide a mobile and maneuverable weapon for combat support of ground troops and vehicles. The M728 vehicle is used for breaching, obstacle removal, and pioneering operations. 
Although the M728 consists of a tank hull and a short-barreled turret, it is not a tank and should not be routinely used against enemy tanks. It is an excellent heavy assault support vehicle when used as part of a combined engineer-infantry team. The CEV is issued two per Engineer Company in the Heavy Division, two per Engineer Company in Corps (Mechanized), three per Engineer Company in Armor/Infantry Separate Brigades and three per Engineer Company in the Armored Cavalry Regiment. 

It is usually equipped with either a hydraulically operated M9 Dozer Blade Assembly or a D7 Mine Plough. The M9 Dozer Blade Assembly is used for clearing the way, filling depressions, leveling ground and for other purposes. The D7 Mine Plough is a V-shaped plough that performs countermine activities by lifting surface laid mines and pushing them to the side as the vehicle moves forward. They are controlled by the driver.
A winch and retractable A-frame crane are mounted on the turret for lifting, carrying and winching operations. The hull front contains the driver's compartment, controls and instruments. The hull rear contains the engine, transmission, fuel tanks, and related automotive components. The turret has positions for the commander, gunner, and loader. The vehicle is also equipped with an NBC protection system for the crew.
It can produce a limited smokescreen by dumping raw diesel fuel into the exhaust system to visually obscure the area around the vehicle as well as  provide a limited vehicle recovery capability.

Weapon Systems
The vehicle is armed with a 165mm M135 short-barreled demolition gun with 30 rounds of HEP (high explosive, plastic) ammunition. The M135 is a license-built copy of the 165 mm L9A1 gun that was used on the British Army's FV4003 Centurion Mk.5 AVRE (armoured vehicle Royal Engineers) tank. The gun's primary purpose is for clearing defensive fixtures and obstacles, such as walls, fences, roadblocks and bunkers, or for destroying buildings and is generally not meant to be for use in anti-personnel or anti-tank warfare. The pushing and heaving effects caused by the HEP round's base detonating fuze and large amount of explosive can demolish barriers and knock down walls. One round creates a 1-foot (0.3 m) diameter hole in a 7-inch (178 mm) thick reinforced concrete wall. The round's effects against bunkers and field fortifications are dramatic, often crushing or smashing entire walls. The gun fires two types of fixed ammunition, the M123E1 HEP Round and the M623 Target Practice Round. The main gun has a coaxial 7.62×51mm NATO M240E1 machine gun, with 2,000 rounds of 7.62mm ammunition. In addition, a .50 caliber M85 machine gun is mounted in the commander's cupola; this has 600 rounds of ammunition.

Service history

United States
It was first deployed in 1968 during the Vietnam War. The M728 was used in fire support, base security, counter ambush fire, direct assault of fortified positions, and limited reconnaissance by fire.  They were also deployed at this time to West Germany during the Cold War to support combat engineer operations and participated in annual REFORGER exercises until 1991.

During mine clearing operations in Operation Desert Shield, the M1 MCRS was found to be cumbersome, heavy and hard to transport. In addition, since they were originally designed for the firmer soil conditions of Europe, its rollers were unsuitable for the softer soil of the desert. Instead of rolling, they often merely skidded, pushing soil in front of them until they bogged down. A mine clearing rake was specially designed and fabricated for the CEV in Operations Desert Shield and Desert Storm. The full width rake allows the CEV to clear minefields in non-cohesive, granular soils such as sand. The Mine Clearing Rake is a V-shaped tined plough that performs countermine activities by lifting buried mines with its tines and pushing them to the side as the vehicle moves forward. Attached to any M728 CEV's D7 Mine Plow or M60 series tank via a M9 Dozer Blade Assembly. The Mine Clearing Rake also uses an aluminum skid shoe which protrudes from the front of the tines and allows the rake to maintain a consistent plowing depth. It clears a path measuring 180 inches wide, accommodating heavy tanks and other armored vehicles. Additional features are that it weighs 4000 pounds and is easily assembled and installed.

They were active during the Desert Shield phase of the Gulf War in clearing suspected minefields, creating temporary defensive fighting positions and staging areas in the deserts near the Iraqi Saudi border. The M728A1s of the 24th Infantry Division and US XVIII Airborne Corps breached the openings for the "Left Hook" flanking of Iraqi forces during the Desert Storm phase of the war, but they were left behind once they began the pursuit and exploitation phase of the operation. A CEV of the 6th Battalion, 6th Regiment, 1st Armored Division, fired 21 M123E1 rounds into the stubbornly defended town of Al Busayyah: "That totally destroyed all the resistance in the town," according to the battalion commander. After the cease-fire, CEV guns were used to break up coke piles that had formed around approximately 20% of the burning oil wells in Kuwait. According to the US Army, the guns reduced the time to break up coke formation from as long as two days to 15 minutes. Commanders were unanimous in their opinion that the engineer force needs an M1 chassis based vehicle for heavy breaching and gap crossing equipment to fully support the M1 Abrams and M2 Bradley vehicles.

3 M728CEVs were temporally acquired for use by the United States Department of Justice's FBI and ATF SWAT teams to conduct Operation Showtime during the 1993 Siege of Waco, Texas.  They were provided to the ATF by Task Force Six of the Texas Army National Guard from Ft. Hood.  They were used to destroy perimeter fences and structures and to crush automobiles to prevent escape from the compound.

US Army M728A1s were deployed in support of the United Nations' Resolution,  NATO led Implementation Force (IFOR) in  December 1995.  Their initial mission was to assist in protecting  and demining the  international airport at Sarajevo. By September 1996 their mission had expanded to include road clearance, bunker demolition and protecting humanitarian aid and assist relief delivery in the whole of Bosnia and Herzegovina, as well as to help protect civilian refugees when required by the Red Cross. Task Force Eagle assumed control of its area of responsibility during a ceremony with United Nations forces at Eagle Base in Tuzla on December 20 consisting of  elements of the 1st Armored Division and its supporting elements from the U.S. V Corps and were joined by forces from twelve other nations. During the campaign in Bosnia, at least 3 M60 Panther MCDVs were used in conjunction with the M728. The Panther would lead the convoy followed by the M728. The Panther operator would control the vehicle from the M728 via a remote control system during road clearing operations.  There was a Closed Circuit Television (CCTV) camera system attached to the front of the Panther so the remote-operator could see where the tank was going through a screen on the remote control unit. The radio control signal was received by a long antenna protruding from the engine deck. The M728 also provided a good secondary clearing action by use of its bulldozer blade as it followed the Panther. It would skim the trail cleared by the Panther pushing away debris and keeping the route clear for other following vehicles, also smoothing out the road surface and could be used for filling in craters left by any exploding mines or ordnance. The CEV was also useful for quickly recovering the Panther should it become stuck, and its crane allowed easy loading and unloading of the mine roller onto transport vehicles. The 1st Armored Division was relieved by the 1st Infantry Division and returned to Germany in November 1996.

The M728 has been determined by the US Army to be inadequate to fully support the M1 Abrams and M2 Bradley vehicles, also cited were the rising costs to maintain and difficulty in acquiring parts for a low density piece of equipment and was retired from combat use with no clear replacement in 2000.  In the late 1990s, the Army decided it could not afford to continue developing complicated, maintenance-heavy vehicles for this purpose. The M1 Grizzly Combat Mobility Vehicle (CMV) was canceled in 2001, and the prototype developed never went into full production. The Marine Corps however persisted and funded its own development and testing of the M1150 Assault Breacher Vehicle.  As of 2009 it is still used by the Army National Guard and US Army Reserve. In 2018 the US Army began to phase out the M728 from service with the Army Reserves and National Guard replacing them with the M1150 and is to be completely withdrawn from US service by 2024.

Other Users

The 8 M728s formerly in service with the Singapore Army were retired in 2016, having been replaced by the Leopard 2-based AEV 3 Kodiak armoured engineer vehicle (AEV).

The Spanish Army began the Programa Coraza – 2000 (Program Armor – 2000) in March 1995.
One of its goals was the development of a new combat engineer vehicle, the CZ-10/25E Alacran,  based on the M60A1 hull and converted from former M60A3 Patton MBTs with upgrades to the engine. It has an external appearance similar to the M728 CEV, but without the 165mm demolition gun, being replaced by a special backhoe. It also has a frontmounted dozer blade and is armed with a machine gun. An initial batch of 38 vehicles have been produced in close liaison with Engineers at the Army Logistics Command.

Portugal retired its M728CEVs in 2013.

As of 2015 they continue in service with the armies of a few other countries including Morocco and Saudi Arabia.

Variants
 
 T118E1 – prototype for the M728 based on the T95 hull
 M728 – version mated to the M60 hull
 M728A1 – version mated to the M60A1 RISE hull
 M60 CZ-10/25E Alacran – Spanish Army variant converted from upgraded M60A1 hulls
Additional equipment
 M9 Bulldozer Kit for the M60 series (SNL G306) (LIN B45390): The M9 bulldozer installed on the M728 will increase the vehicle's weight by 4.45 tons (4.04 metric tons). It is controlled by the driver.
M58 Mine Clearing Line Charge (MICLIC) (LIN L67432): The system consists of the launcher mounted on a M200A1 tracked trailer, an M147 firing kit, an M58A4 line charge and a 5-inch Mk22 Mod 4 rocket. The line charge is 350 feet long and contains 5 pounds per linear foot of C-4 explosive. In the event a MICLIC fails to detonate normally, it can be manually activated by time-delay fuses every few feet along the length of it. The MICLIC can provide a rapidly emplaced lane through mine and wire obstacles up to 14 meters wide and 100 meters deep. Mines containing magnetic or other non-pressure-sensitive fuses may escape destruction from the blast overpressure, but will usually be uncovered and blown to the side out of the lane.  Armored vehicles avoid mines by keeping the left track in  the cleared centerline. Cleared lanes should also be proofed with plows or rollers when available.
 M1 Mine Clearing Roller System (MCRS) (LIN M18157):  The MCRS is installed on the front of the tank through a removable adapter, and provides the capability for neutralization of Anti-Tank (AT) land mines, which are buried or laid on the surface, in the track path of the vehicle. The MCRS consists of two roller banks with two push arm assemblies. Each roller bank has four rollers, which apply ground pressure higher than that exerted by the tank. This principle ensures the explosion of pressure fused anti tank mines, which would otherwise explode under the track itself. Additionally an Anti-Magnetic Mine Activating Device (AMMAD) is connected between the two roller banks. The system weighs 10 short tons (9.07 metric tons).
D7 Surface Mine Plow (SMP) (LIN B71620): It is a track-width plow designed to skim the surface of a flat roadway or trail, not to defeat buried mines. It is controlled by the driver.
Track Width Mine Plow (TWMP) (LIN B71621): The Track Width Mine Plough (TWMP) uses a raking action to clear a safe path by bringing concealed or buried mines and improvised explosive devices (IEDs) to the surface and moving them wide and clear of the vehicle. It can be fitted with a AMMAD to counter magnetic influence fused mines.
Full Width Mine Rake (FWMR) (LIN B51986): A rake assembly for unearthing and disposing of buried and surface laid mines in sand and loose earth. Specifically designed for use in Operations Desert Shield and Desert Storm.

Operators

  – three in service with the Royal Army of Oman
  – six in service with the Royal Moroccan Army are still in service as of 2016
  – 15 in service with the Saudi Arabian Army
  – 38 M60CZ-10/25E Alacran
  – Retired from combat use 2000, 262 are relegated to the Army National Guard and US Army Reserve (as of 2007) Phased replacement with the M1150 Assault Breacher Vehicle starting in 2018.

Former Operators

  – three were in service with the Portuguese Army (retired in 2013)
  – 8 formerly in service with the Singapore Army (and most likely stored in reserve) as of 2016

Notes

See also
M1150 Assault Breacher Vehicle
M60 tank
List of U.S. military vehicles by model number
G-numbers (SNL G303)

References
Notes

External links

Global Security's website on the M728 CEV
AFV database

Military engineering vehicles of the United States
Cold War armored fighting vehicles of the United States
General Dynamics land vehicles
Military vehicles introduced in the 1960s